The brown-chested alethe (Chamaetylas poliocephala) is a species of bird in the family Muscicapidae. It has a discontinuous range of presence across the African tropical rainforest.

Its natural habitats are subtropical or tropical moist lowland forest and subtropical or tropical moist montane forest.

References

brown-chested alethe
Birds of the Gulf of Guinea
Birds of the African tropical rainforest
brown-chested alethe
brown-chested alethe
Taxonomy articles created by Polbot